Give Me Convenience or Give Me Death (stylized as Give me convenience OR give me death) is a compilation album by the American hardcore punk band Dead Kennedys. It was released in June 1987 through front man Jello Biafra's record label Alternative Tentacles.

Overview
The album consists of songs (or in some cases, different versions of songs) that were not released on the band's studio albums. The original vinyl version had tracks 16 and 17 on an extra flexi disc. The album was certified gold by both BPI and the RIAA in December 2007. The title is a play on the ultimatum by Patrick Henry, "Give me liberty, or give me death!", and is intended as a commentary on American consumerism. Give Me Convenience or Give Me Death was the last Dead Kennedys album that Biafra approved the production of, which also led to it being the last album released through Alternative Tentacles.

The album includes "Pull My Strings", which was played only once on March 25, 1980, when Dead Kennedys were invited to perform at the Bay Area Music Awards in front of music industry bigwigs to give the event some "new wave credibility". The band spent the day of the show practicing "California Über Alles", the song they were asked to play. About 15 seconds into the song Jello Biafra said, "Hold it! We've gotta prove that we're adults now. We're not a punk rock band, we're a new wave band."
 
The band, who all wore white shirts with a big, black S painted on the front, pulled black ties from around the backs of their necks to form a dollar sign, then started playing "Pull My Strings", a satirical attack on the ethics of the mainstream music industry. The song also referenced the Knack's biggest hit, "My Sharona". The song was never recorded in the studio but this performance, the only time the song was ever performed, was included on the album.

Also included is "Night of the Living Rednecks", which was recorded during a show in Portland, Oregon in 1979 when East Bay Ray snapped a guitar string as the band finished their song "Chemical Warfare". While the guitar string was being replaced, Biafra vamped for time by telling a story, backed by Peligro and Flouride performing a jazz-style instrumental, about how on the last trip the band made to Portland, where he had a confrontation with some "dumb rich kids" in a "life-size Hot Wheels car" that involved him throwing a rock at their vehicle after they sprayed water on him and later trapping himself in a telephone booth when they retaliated.

Track listing

Personnel
 Jello Biafra – vocals, producer, artwork, compiler
 East Bay Ray – guitar, echoplex, producer, mixer
 Klaus Flouride – bass, backing vocals
 Ted – drums (tracks 1-5, 8, 11-13, 16), artwork 
 D.H. Peligro – drums, backing vocals (tracks 6, 7, 9, 10, 14, 15, 17)
 6025 – rhythm guitar (tracks 12, 13)

Additional Performers
 Ninotchka (Therese Soder) – backing vocals on "Insight"

Production
 Thom Wilson – producer
 Geza X – producer, backing vocals
 Norm – producer
 Elliot Mazer – producer
 Jim Keylor – engineer
 John Cuniberti – producer, engineer
 Oliver Dicicco – mixer, engineer
 Pippin Youth – mixer
 Dee Dee Graves – artwork
 Winston 
Smith – artwork
 Jayed Scotti ( artist)

Charts

Certifications

References

Dead Kennedys albums
Albums produced by Geza X
1987 compilation albums
Alternative Tentacles compilation albums